Amini is a census town in the Union Territory of Lakshadweep, India. It is also the name of the island where the town stands and of the atoll that contains that island.

History
Amini Island was one of the first islands in the archipelago to be inhabited. The artisans on this island are known for making walking sticks out of coconut shells and tortoise shells as well as carved stone and coral motifs.

Geography
The channel between Amini Island and Cardamom Island is safe and deep, but depths of less than 10 meters project 0.5 mile south from the south tip of the reefs surrounding Cardamom Island. Amini Island Light is shown on the south point of the island. 
Amini Island, the most important of the Amindivi Islands, is oval, with the long axis oriented northeast-southwest. It is fringed by a reef 0.3 to 0.6 km wide.

Demographics
Amini village is in the middle of the west coast of the Island. A raised stone platform jetty, with steps leading to the beach, is in front of the village. There is a post office and a hospital at the village. 
The small village of Hujrapali is on the east coast.
As of the 2011 India census, the island of Amini had a population of 7,657. Males constitute 50% of the population and females 50%. Amini has an average literacy rate of 71%, higher than the national average of 59.5%, with 55% of the males and 45% of females literate. 15% of the population is under 6 years of age.

Pitti Bank
Amini Island lies at the northeastern extremity of Pitti Bank, 42 km from small, uninhabited Pitti Island (not to be confused with Pitti Islet of Kalpeni Atoll), which is located at the opposite southwestern extremity of the bank. Pitti Bank, also oriented along a northeast-southwest axis, is 49 km long, in the northern part from 2 to 7 km wide and in the southern part up to 18 km wide. Kadmat island, although just 5 km northeast of Amini Island, is separated from it by a deep channel and thus forms a separate geographical unit.

Administration
The bank belongs to the township of Amini Island of Aminidivi Tehsil.

Image gallery

References 

Hydrographic Description (Indian Ocean Pilot)

Islands of Lakshadweep
Cities and towns in Lakshadweep district
Islands of India